Nasrabad (also Romanized as Naşrābād; also known as Nasrābād-e Pīshkūh, Naşrābād-e Pīshkūh, and Nasr Abad Pishkooh) is a village in Nasrabad Rural District of the Central District of Taft County, Yazd province, Iran. At the 2006 National Census, its population was 1,775 in 551 households. The following census in 2011 counted 2,715 people in 835 households. The latest census in 2016 showed a population of 1,898 people in 619 households; it was the largest village in its rural district.

References 

Taft County

Populated places in Yazd Province

Populated places in Taft County